Jean Costes (15 August 1900 – 3 April 1983), better known by his pen name Jacques Bordiot, was a French journalist and writer who focused mainly on anti-masonic conspiracy theories.

Life
Costes attended the École Navale and served as an artillery officer and naval lieutenant in the Middle East. In 1940, he chose to follow Marshal Philippe Pétain and join the Vichy armed forces. In 1945, he was dismissed from the French Navy and was then imprisoned during the épuration; one of his best known fellow detainees was Henry Coston.

During the 1950s he worked at Noël Jacquemart's Écho de la Presse and at La Vie des Métiers. He then worked for the extreme right-wing periodical Lectures françaises as an editorial writer and published several books on Freemasonry, synarchies, belief of Antisemitic conspiracies and "hidden rulers".

Theories
According to Bordiot, between 1918 and 1922, Vladimir Lenin paid the investment bank of Kuhn, Loeb & Co. approximately 600 million gold rubles, equivalent to approximately $450 million, while after the Bolshevik Revolution the Rockefellers' company Standard Oil of New Jersey bought 50% of the oilfields in the Caucasus, although they were officially state property.

In his book Une main cachée dirige..., he analyses power in the Anglo-American sphere.

Publications 
 Infiltrations ennemies dans l'Église ([Enemy Infiltration in the Church]; with Henry Coston, Léon de Poncins, Édith Delamare, Gilles de Couessin), Paris, Librairie française, 1970.
 Une main cachée dirige... ([A Hidden Hand Directs...]), Paris: Documents et témoignages, 1974; rev. ed. 1984; Paris: Éditions du Trident, 1993. 
 L'Occident démantelé. Opinions et documents ([The Dismantled West: Opinions and Documents]), Paris: La Librairie française, 1976.
 Le Pouvoir occulte, fourrier du communisme. Vague rouge sur l'Europe ([The Hidden Power: Quartermaster of Communism. Red Wave Over Europe]), Chiré-en-Montreuil: Éditions de Chiré, 1976. 
 Le Parlement européen, une imposture, une utopie, un danger ([The European Parliament: A Sham, a Utopia, a Danger]), Paris: La Librairie française, 1978.
 La Comisión Trilateral y el poder internacional del dinero (in Spanish; [The Trilateral Commission and the International Power of Money]), Buenos Aires: Cabildo, 1980
 Le Gouvernement invisible. Documents et témoignage ([The Invisible Government: Documents and Testimony]), preface by Henry Coston, Paris: La Librairie française, 1983; 2nd ed. 1987.

Sources

References

Further reading

External links
Jacques Bordiot (1900-1983), brief biographical sketch (in French), with photograph, at the Editions de Chiré publishing house website

1900 births
1983 deaths
People from Agen
French prisoners and detainees
French conspiracy theorists
20th-century French writers
20th-century French male writers
French male essayists
French political writers
Writers from Nouvelle-Aquitaine
Far-right politics in France
Anti-Masonry
French anti-communists
20th-century French essayists
École Navale alumni
French military personnel of World War II
20th-century French journalists